A drinking song is a song sung while drinking alcohol. Most drinking songs are folk songs or commercium songs, and may be varied from person to person and region to region, in both the lyrics and in the music.

In Germany, drinking songs are called Trinklieder.

In Sweden, where they are called dryckesvisor, there are drinking songs associated with Christmas, Midsummer, and other celebrations. An example of such a song is "Helan går".

In Spain, Asturias, patria querida (the anthem of Asturias) is usually depicted as a drinking song.

In France, historical types of drinking songs are Chanson pour boire and Air à boire.

History 
The first record of a drinking song dates to the 11th century, and derives from the Carmina Burana, a 13th-century historical collection of poems, educational songs, love sonnets and "entertainment" or drinking songs.

In popular culture 
Musical artist Homebrew Stew (Rich Stewart) wrote a magazine article in the November 2002 issue of Modern Drunkard titled "Rhythm and Booze: The Top 86 Drinking Songs".

Traditional drinking songs

English
 "99 Bottles of Beer"
 "Barnacle Bill the Sailor"
 "Barrett's Privateers"
 "The Barley Mow"
 "Beer, Beer, Beer"
 "California Drinking Song"
 "Engineers' Drinking Song"
 "Fathom the Bowl"
 "Friends in Low Places"
 "Good Ship Venus"
 "I Used to Work in Chicago"
 "If You're Happy and You Know It"
 "Lanigan's Ball"
 "Limericks"
 "Little Brown Jug"
 "Seven Drunken Nights"
 "The Goddamned Dutch"
 "The S&M Man"
 "Walking Down Canal Street"
 "Whiskey in the Jar"
 "The Wild Rover"

Other
 "Bevilo tutto" (Italian song)
 "Drobna drabnitsa" (Belarusian song)
 "Ein Heller und ein Batzen"
 "Eisgekühlter Bommerlunder"
"Helan Går" (Swedish)
 "Libiamo ne' lieti calici" from "La Traviata" by "Giuseppe Verdi"

Lieder
Franz Schubert wrote several lieder (art songs) known as "Trinklied":
  75, 	 Cantata "Trinklied" ['Freunde, sammelt euch im Kreise'] for bass, men's choir and piano (1813)
 D 148 (Op. posth. 131, No. 2), Cantata "Trinklied" ['Brüder! unser Erdenwallen'] for tenor, men's choir and piano (1815)
 D 169, 	Chorus "Trinklied vor der Schlacht" ['Schlacht, du brichst an!'] for double unison choir and piano (1815)
 D 183, 	Cantata "Trinklied" ['Ihr Freunde und du gold’ner Wein'] for voice, unison choir and piano (1815)
 D 242, 	Trio "Trinklied im Winter" ['Das Glas gefüllt!'] for two tenors and bass (1815, 1st setting; D deest is the 2nd setting, with a different title)
 D 267, 	Quartet "Trinklied" ['Auf! Jeder sei nun froh und sorgenfrei!'] for two tenors, two basses and piano (1815)
 D 356, 	Quartet "Trinklied" ['Funkelnd im Becher so helle, so hold'] for two tenors, two basses and piano (1816, fragment)
 D 426, 	Trio "Trinklied (Herr Bacchus ist ein braver Mann)" ['Herr Bacchus ist ein braver Mann'] for two tenors and bass (1816, lost)
 D 427, 	Trio "Trinklied im Mai" ['Bekränzet die Tonnen'] for two tenors and bass (1816)
 D 847, 	Quartet "Trinklied aus dem 16. Jahrhundert" ['Edit Nonna, edit Clerus'] for two tenors and two basses (1825)
 D 888, 	Song "Trinklied" ['Bacchus, feister Fürst des Weins'] for voice and piano (1826)

See also 
 Brindisi
 Snapsvisa

References

External links 

 Drinking Songs Sheet Music 
 Lyrics, Music and MP3s for each drinking song
 Hash House Harrier songbook
 Hash House Harrier songbook links
 A Tankard Of Ale An Anthology 120 Of Drinking Songs, complete online book by Theodore Maynard circa 1919

Notes 
 Cray, Ed. The Erotic Muse: American Bawdy Songs (University of Illinois, 1992).
 Legman, Gershon. The Horn Book. (New York: University Press, 1964).
 Reuss, Richard A. An Annotated Field Collection of Songs From the American College Student Oral Tradition (Bloomington: Indiana Univ. Masters Thesis, 1965).

Drinking culture

Articles containing video clips
Song forms
Sing-along